The rufous-breasted antthrush (Formicarius rufipectus) is a species of bird in the family Formicariidae. It is found in Colombia, Costa Rica, Ecuador, Panama, Peru, and Venezuela. Its natural habitat is subtropical or tropical moist montane forest.

References

rufous-breasted antthrush
Birds of the Talamancan montane forests
Birds of the Northern Andes
rufous-breasted antthrush
rufous-breasted antthrush
Taxonomy articles created by Polbot